Omar, officially the Municipality of Omar (Tausūg: Kawman sin Omar), is a  municipality in the province of Sulu, Philippines. According to the 2020 census, it has a population of 28,070 people.

It was created out of the 8 barangays of Luuk, by virtue of Muslim Mindanao Autonomy Act No. 194, which was subsequently ratified in a plebiscite held on July 18, 2007.

Geography

Barangays
Omar is politically subdivided into 8 barangays. 
 Andalan
 Angilan
 Capual Island
 Huwit-huwit
 Lahing-Lahing
 Niangkaan
 Sucuban
 Tangkuan

Climate

Demographics

Economy

References

External links
 Omar Profile at PhilAtlas.com
 [ Philippine Standard Geographic Code]
 Omar Profile at the DTI Cities and Municipalities Competitive Index
 Memorandum Order No. 260
 Philippine Census Information
 Local Governance Performance Management System

Municipalities of Sulu